In enzymology, a streptomycin 3"-kinase is an enzyme that catalyzes the chemical reaction

ATP + streptomycin  ADP + streptomycin 3"-phosphate

Thus, the two substrates of this enzyme are ATP and streptomycin, whereas its two products are ADP and streptomycin 3''-phosphate.

This enzyme belongs to the family of transferases, specifically those transferring phosphorus-containing groups (phosphotransferases) with an alcohol group as acceptor.  The systematic name of this enzyme class is ATP:streptomycin 3"-phosphotransferase. Other names in common use include streptomycin 3"-kinase (phosphorylating), and streptomycin 3"-phosphotransferase.

References

 

EC 2.7.1
Enzymes of unknown structure